Metal Slug is a series of run and gun video games first released on Neo-Geo arcade machines and game consoles created by SNK. It was also ported to other consoles, such as the Sega Saturn, the PlayStation, the Neo-Geo Pocket Color and more recently, the Game Boy Advance, PlayStation 2, iPhone, iPod Touch, Xbox, Xbox 360 and Nintendo DS. There is also an anthology of the first 7 games in the main series (including Metal Slug X) available for the Wii, PlayStation Portable, and PlayStation 2. In 2009, the first three games were officially ported by Games Load to Windows.

Games

Main series

Remakes

Spin-offs

Compilations

Metal Slug Zero Online 

Metal Slug Zero Online was a massively multiplayer online game, part of the Metal Slug series. It was being developed by SNK Playmore, THQ, and Sammy Corporation for the South Korean market. There was no word on a Japanese or North American release. The game was on course for a 2009 release, but in the summer of it, developer Dragonfly suspended development of the game due to their belief that the achievement of Metal Slug Zero Online being developed by Wiz Hands is far below their expectation, and the game could not conform to the trend of current gaming industry. The online servers for the game ended on 24 March 2013.

References

Metal Slug
M